The March Stones of Aberdeen are boundary marker stones encircling the land owned by the Scottish royal burgh, dating from before 1525.

In the 1300s Robert the Bruce granted the Royal Burgh of Aberdeen unusually strong rights over the burgh itself and the open lands outside the city. The land was valuable and so the boundary was marked out by the March Stones, "march" being the word used to describe a border area. In their first incarnation the March Stones were large standing stones and the boundary line was augmented with cairns or it ran along natural features such as streams. Because Aberdeen is an eastern coastal town the  line of stones only encircled it to the west. To discourage encroachment the bounds were regularly ridden around by burgesses in the "riding of the marches", the Scots equivalent of beating the bounds, but eventually this became merely a ceremonial matter. 

The area marked out, the so-called Freedom Lands of Aberdeen, lay outside the "City Royalty" – the urban area itself and the crofts just on its outskirts. One line of outer stones ran along the outer boundary of the Freedom Lands and a second line, the inner stones, was added in the early 19th century, marking the division of the royalty from the Freedom Lands. 

The March Stones of Aberdeen were first written about in 1525 in connection with a riding of the marches. As time went by the stones themselves became marked for identification and between 1790 and 1810 new stones were installed with inscribed sequence numbers, sometimes alongside the earlier ones. Most of these later stones are still to be found although some are later replacements.

Historical background
The inhabitants of the Royal Burgh of Aberdeen had sheltered King Robert the Bruce and supported him militarily in 1308 at the Battle of Barra so in 1313 he granted the burgh burgesses custodianship of the Royal Forest of the Stocket, an extensive area of rough land just to the west of the town. although he retained his right for hunting and forestry. Six years later Bruce granted Aberdeen ownership rights over the Royal Burgh and Forest of Stocket for an annual rent, or feu, of £213 6s 8d pound Scots. The city burgesses later purchased three other areas of land: Rubislaw (bought 1379), Cruives, now Woodside (1405) and Gilcomston (1680). This land, along with the Stocket Forest, became called the Freedom Lands. Hence these lands became the right and responsibility of the burgesses of the Royal Burgh of Aberdeen with the income accruing to the Aberdeen Common Good Fund.

Boundary markers

In the 16th century a border region was called a march and the first boundary markers of the march of the Freedom Lands were probably natural features supplemented with small cairns. The earliest description of the marches was in 1525 concerning a "riding of the marches", the Scots equivalent of beating the bounds. This greatly ceremonial practice had its origins in ensuring the boundaries were not being encroached upon by neighbouring landowners.

In 1525 there was no standard system of marking. Any large earthfast stones might have incorporated saucer shapes filled with lead sometimes embossed with the city's seal or might have a contained a varied number of holes. A 1578 description of March Stone 1 says the city's mark was engraved in the stone itself. After the 1673 riding, several cairns were ordered to be erected along part of the line of the marches.

March Stones

After 1790 a new style of marking was adopted, one that the stones still display. The stones were inscribed with a sequential number followed by the letters "ABD" for Aberdeen. Aberdeen has two sets of march, or boundary, stones. The outer line surrounds the area of the Freedom Lands. The inner line of stones marks a smaller area: the boundary of the crofts immediately around the medieval Royal Burgh of Aberdeen. The land occupied by the crofts was known as the Burgh Roods or the terrirtorium croftorum burgi.  The inner area as a whole, including the town itself, was called the City Royalty and the inner stones marking its boundary were marked with an additional "CR". This systematic style of marking was completed by 1810 but the new stones were not always in the same locations as the previous ones. In particular, where natural boundaries such as burns had wandered, the stones were moved to match. Altogether there were 74 stones: the southernmost was inscribed Alpha, the northernmost Omega, and between them 65 had a number inscribed. Additionally seven others on the inner ring were simply lettered CR with no number. The distance from Alpha to Omega along the outer line of stones is about  extending from the estuary of the River Dee to that of the River Don.

Individual stones
Cruickshank and Gunn, in their 1929 book The Freedom Lands and Marches of Aberdeen, provided details, photographs and a map of the individual March Stones. Their descriptions are accompanied by descriptions from Kennedy's Annals of Aberdeen. In 2021 Aberdeen City Council produced an updated pamphlet with similar information. None of the stones standing are the originals but some have the original stones lying beside them. In urban areas some stones have been laid flush to the ground. The numbering of the selection of stones in this article follows that used in the publications mentioned.

Inner stones

Outer stones

See also
Crabstane of Aberdeen – a boundary stone in Aberdeen marking an estate boundary
Lang Stane, Aberdeen – a boundary stone or a  stone from a stone circle

Notes

References

Citations

Works cited

 (footnotes at pages 381–384 of volume I, book II, chapter I). Also Volume II 

 
March Stones of Aberdeen
March Stones of Aberdeen 
March Stones of Aberdeen
Aberdeen March Stones